The Windward Islands are the southern, generally larger islands of the Lesser Antilles. Part of the West Indies, they lie south of the Leeward Islands, approximately between latitudes 10° and 16° N and longitudes 60° and 62° W. 

The name was also used to refer to a British colony which existed between 1833 and 1960 and originally consisted of the islands of Grenada, Saint Lucia, and Saint Vincent. Today these islands constitute three sovereign states, with the latter now known as Saint Vincent and the Grenadines. 

The island of Dominica was traditionally considered a part of the Leeward Islands until 1940 when it was transferred from the British Leeward Islands colony to the British Windward Islands.  It now composes the fourth sovereign state in the group.

Barbados (until 1885) and Tobago (until 1889) were also part of the British Windward Islands colony, but are not today regarded as being part of the Windward Islands grouping.

Name and geography
The prevailing trade winds in the West Indies blow east to west. The combination of trans-Atlantic currents and winds that provided the fastest route across the ocean brought sailing ships heading to the New World  to the rough dividing line between two groups of islands. Those that fell to windward became the Windward Islands, to leeward the Leeward Islands.

Sailing vessels departing from Africa would first encounter the southeasternmost "Windward" islands of the Lesser Antilles in their west-northwesterly heading to the final destinations in the Caribbean, Central America, and Northern America. The chain of Windward Islands forms a part of the easternmost boundary of the Caribbean Sea.

However, even in modern usage in languages other than English, notably, Dutch, French, and Spanish, all of the Lesser Antilles from the Virgin Islands to Trinidad and Tobago are known as the 'Windward Islands' (Bovenwindse Eilanden in Dutch, Îles du Vent in French, and Islas de Barlovento in Spanish). The ABC Islands and the other islands along the Venezuelan coast, known in English as the Leeward Antilles, are known in languages other than English as the 'Leeward Islands'.

List of countries and territory in the Windward Islands
There are four countries and one territory in the Windward Islands:

 
 
 Carriacou and Petite Martinique
  (France)
 
 
 Grenadines
 Saint Vincent

Politics

See also

 British Windward Islands
 Deafness in the Windward Islands
 Intra-Americas Sea
 Leeward Antilles
 Leeward Islands
 Lesser Antilles
 
 
 
 Southern Caribbean
 Windward Islands Cricket Board of Control
 Windward Islands cricket team

References

External links
 

 
Archipelagoes of the Caribbean Sea
Lesser Antilles